Yao syndrome (YAOS) (formerly called NOD2-associated autoinflammatory disease) is an autoinflammatory syndrome involving episodes of fever and abnormal inflammation affecting many parts of the body, particularly the skin, joints, and gastrointestinal system.

Signs and symptoms
Arthralgia (Arthritis)
Fever
Diarrhea
Abdominal Pain
Keratoconjunctivitis Sicca (Dry eyes)
Pleurisy
Idiopathic Pericarditis
Xerostomia (Dry mouth)
Erythematous Plaques
Dermatitis

Diagnostic criteria
Yao syndrome is diagnosed if 2 major criteria, at least one minor criterion, the molecular criterion, and exclusion criteria are fulfilled.

Treatment
A study to determine the effectiveness of Novartis pharmaceutical drug Canakinumab was conducted.  In this study, canakinumab was effective in patients with YAOS, and thus clinical trial of canakinumab may be warranted as a therapeutic option for this disease.

Inheritance
Yao Syndrome inheritance is classified as Multifactorial Inheritance.

References

External links

 MedGen-Yao Syndrome
 Genetics Home Reference-Yao Syndrome

Autoinflammatory syndromes